Caudwell may refer to:

People
 John David Caudwell (born 7 October 1952) is a British billionaire businessman who founded the mobile phone retailer Phones 4u.
 Christopher Caudwell was the pseudonym of Christopher St John Sprigg (20 October 1907 – 13 February 1937), a British Marxist writer.
 Sarah Caudwell was the pseudonym of Sarah Cockburn (27 May 1939 – 28 January 2000), a British barrister and writer of detective stories.
 Don Caudwell (12 September 1929 – 14 May 2006) was an Australian rules footballer who played with Collingwood in the Victorian Football League (VFL).